Marschweg-Stadion is a multi-use stadium in Oldenburg, Germany. Since 1991 is has been used as the stadium of VfB Oldenburg matches. The capacity of the stadium is 15,200 spectators, of which 4,500 are seats and 10,700 standing places. It achieved a record attendance of 32,000 before reconstruction.

References

1951 establishments in Germany
Buildings and structures completed in 1951
Football venues in Germany
Buildings and structures in Oldenburg (city)
Tourist attractions in Oldenburg (city)
Sports venues in Lower Saxony
VfB Oldenburg